The Land Air Water Party (abbreviated as The LAW Party) was a minor political party in British Columbia, Canada. It was registered with Elections BC for the 2017 general election, but was deregistered in February 2018. The party's founder was Mervyn Ritchie.

The LAW Party was founded on July 13, 2015, with the goal of bringing more women and Aboriginal people into the BC government and ending government investment in the fossil fuel industry.

It nominated one candidate in the 2017 provincial election, who was not elected.

References

External links
 Official website
 Official Facebook page

Provincial political parties in British Columbia
Political parties established in 2015
2015 establishments in British Columbia
2018 disestablishments in British Columbia
Political parties disestablished in 2018